Vnukova is a rural locality (a village) in Verkh-Invenskoye Rural Settlement, Kudymkarsky District, Perm Krai, Russia. The population was 69 as of 2010. There are 8 streets.

Geography 
Vnukova is located 16 km southwest of Kudymkar (the district's administrative centre) by road. Novozhilova is the nearest rural locality.

References 

Rural localities in Kudymkarsky District